Oakfield Township may refer to the following places in the United States:

 Oakfield Township, Audubon County, Iowa
 Oakfield Township, Michigan

See also

 Oakfield (disambiguation)

Township name disambiguation pages